Alf Budd may refer to:
Alf Budd (rugby union, born 1880) (1880–1962), New Zealand rugby union player who played for the All Blacks in 1910
Alf Budd (rugby union, born 1922) (1922–1989), New Zealand rugby union player who played for the All Blacks in 1946 and 1949